The Auld Alliance Trophy is a trophy in rugby union awarded to the winner of the annual Six Nations Championship match between France and Scotland.

The Trophy was first awarded in 2018, the centenary of the end of World War I, to commemorate the French and Scottish rugby players who were killed during the conflict, in particular the captains of the two nations in the last matches played before the First World War – Eric Milroy (Scotland) and Marcel Burgun (France).  The Trophy was carried on to the pitch at Murrayfield before the Six Nations match by Lachlan Ross and Romain Cabanis,  11-year-old descendants of the Milroy and Burgun families. In all, 30 Scottish and 22 French internationals were killed in the war.

Manufactured from solid silver by Thomas Lyte & Co. and featuring a design of poppies and cornflowers for remembrance, the Trophy was promoted to the Scottish Rugby Union and the Fédération française de rugby by Patrick Caublot of Amiens Rugby Club and by David Anderson, Milroy's great-great-nephew.

The Trophy is inscribed, in English and French, with the words: "In memory of Eric Milroy, Marcel Burgun and all the French and Scottish rugby players who fell during World War I".

The name is a reference to the 13th century Auld Alliance between France and Scotland.

Overall, as of 2021 there have been 98 matches between the two countries. There have been three Rugby World Cup meetings, each time in the initial pool stage, with the first fixture ending in a draw (20–20 in 1987) and France winning both of the others (22–19 in 1995, and 51–9 in 2003). Recently in October 2022, a descendant of Eric Milroy could be identified, it is Ollie Smith player of the Glagows Warriors and the Scottish rugby team

Matches

Results

See also 
 List of international rugby union players killed in World War I
 Rugby union trophies and awards
 Millennium Trophy, for winners of England v. Ireland in the Six Nations
 Calcutta Cup, for winners of England v. Scotland in the Six Nations
 Giuseppe Garibaldi Trophy, for winners of France v. Italy in the Six Nations
 Centenary Quaich, for winners of Ireland v. Scotland in the Six Nations
 Triple Crown Trophy, if either England, Ireland, Scotland or Wales beat the other three Home Nations.

References

Six Nations Championship trophies
International rugby union competitions hosted by France
International rugby union competitions hosted by Scotland
History of rugby union matches between France and Scotland
Trophy
Rugby union international rivalry trophies
Recurring sporting events established in 2018